Alexandre da Silva Santana (born December 10, 1979), known professionally as Babu Santana, is a Brazilian actor and singer. Born in Vidigal, Rio de Janeiro, Santana acted in plays at school since his 12 years and joined the theater group Nós do Morro when he was 17. His first roles in films were in 2002 when he acted in City of God and Something in the Air.   In addition to being an actor, Babu is the vocalist of the band Babu Santana e Os Cabeças de Água-Viva, the band fuses samba, reggae, soul and funk. He is the father of two daughters and one son.

In 2020, Babu was one of the housemates on Big Brother Brasil 20, finishing at 4th place.

Filmography

Discography

Awards and nominations

References

External links

1979 births
20th-century Brazilian male actors
21st-century Brazilian male singers
21st-century Brazilian singers
Afro-Brazilian male singers
Brazilian male film actors
Brazilian male stage actors
Living people
Male actors from Rio de Janeiro (city)
Big Brother Brasil
Big Brother (franchise) contestants